Taylors Creek may refer to:

Taylors Creek (Canoochee Creek tributary), a stream in Georgia
Taylors Creek, Georgia, a ghost town
Taylors Creek (Kentucky), a stream in Kentucky
Taylors Creek (Caraway Creek tributary), a stream in Randolph County, North Carolina